Eilat Pride is an annual Lesbian, Gay, Bisexual and Transgender (LGBT) pride festival that is held in Eilat, Israel. The event was established in 2001. In 2010 there were three assaults on parade goers.

See also
 Tel Aviv Pride
 LGBT rights in Israel

References

External links
Eilat Pride 

Pride parades in Israel
Recurring events established in 2001
Eilat
2001 establishments in Israel